Shawn Wayne Hatosy is an American film and television actor and director. He is best known for his roles in the films In & Out, The Faculty, Outside Providence, Anywhere but Here, The Cooler, and Alpha Dog. He is also well known for his role as Detective Sammy Bryant on the TNT crime drama series Southland and starred as Andrew "Pope" Cody in the TNT crime drama series Animal Kingdom.

Early life and education
Shawn Hatosy was born in Ijamsville, Maryland, to Carol Ann (née Owens), a loan officer, and Wayne Thomas Hatosy. He has Hungarian and Irish ancestry. He was raised in the Loch Haven neighborhood of Ijamsville, Maryland. Hatosy attended New Market Middle School and graduated from Linganore High School in 1994.

Career
Since appearing in Public Enemies (2009), starring Johnny Depp and Christian Bale, and Bad Lieutenant: Port of Call New Orleans (2009), in which Hatosy portrays Nicolas Cage's partner, Armand Benoit, Hatosy has primarily worked in television.

Earlier films included Soldier's Girl, The Faculty, In & Out, The Cooler, Outside Providence, Anywhere but Here,  John Q, A Guy Thing, and 2006's Alpha Dog. Hatosy auditioned for a leading role in the 1999 film Varsity Blues but lost it to James Van Der Beek.

Hatosy has appeared in such television shows as SEAL Team, CSI: Crime Scene Investigation, The Twilight Zone, Felicity, Six Feet Under, ER, Law & Order, Numb3rs, My Name Is Earl, Hawaii Five-0, Criminal Minds, Fear the Walking Dead, Flaked, and Bosch. He portrayed Detective Sammy Bryant in the NBC/TNT television series Southland. Other roles were serial killer Boyd Fowler on the Showtime television series Dexter and police officer Terry McCandless in Reckless. He played Andrew "Pope" Cody in the TNT crime drama series Animal Kingdom.

Hatosy was a singer in his own band and graduated from Linganore High School in 1994. He made an appearance in Wheatus's music video for their single "A Little Respect". He also made an appearance in Justin Timberlake's music video for his single "What Goes Around... Comes Around", alongside Scarlett Johansson as the drunk love interest.

In 2005, Hatosy performed opposite Al Pacino in Lyle Kessler's Orphans, at the Greenway Court Theatre in Los Angeles. Hatosy also took on the title role in the La Jolla Playhouse production of The Collected Works of Billy the Kid. Off-Broadway, he starred opposite Anna Paquin in the Paul Weitz comedy Roulette.

Personal life
Shawn married Kelly Albanese in December 2010. The couple lives in Los Angeles with their sons, Cassius Hatosy (born June 16, 2006), Leo Hatosy (born November 18, 2012), and Finn Jones Hatosy (born October 29, 2017).

Filmography

Film

Television

Awards and nominations

References

External links
 
 
 

American male film actors
American male television actors
American people of Hungarian descent
American people of Irish descent
Living people
Male actors from Maryland
People from Middletown, Maryland
1975 births